The Ruger No. 3 is a single-shot rifle produced by Sturm, Ruger & Co from 1973 to 1986. It is based on the No. 1, with some modifications made to reduce costs, such as a simpler one-piece breech lever. It also was shipped with an uncheckered stock and a plastic buttplate. It has been described as "superbly accurate".

Approximately 1400 No. 3 actions were installed into FGR-17 Viper antitank rocket launcher tubes and used for sub-caliber training.

The No. 3 was chambered for .22 Hornet, .223 Remington, .30-40 Krag, .375 Winchester, .44 Magnum, and .45-70.

References

External links
 Sturm, Ruger & Co. official site
 Ruger No.3 Product History
 Instruction manual

Falling-block rifles
Ruger rifles